Griante is a comune (municipality) in the Province of Como in the Italian region Lombardy, located on the western shore of Lake Como about  northeast of Como between Menaggio (to the north) and Tremezzo. Griante also borders the communes of Bellagio and Varenna on the other side of the lake.  The commune of Griante itself is situated some 50 metres above lake level, on a wide plateau.  The portion of the commune sitting on the lake, where the community's tourist industry is situated, is known as Cadenabbia di Griante.

In 1853, Giulio Ricordi built a mansion, Villa Margherita Ricordi (Coordinates 45.994321N 9.238636E), in Cadenabbia di Griante on the shore of Lake Como where Verdi visited and is thought to have composed some parts of La Traviata.

References

External links

Official website
Unofficial website
News and Events - Griante

Cities and towns in Lombardy